Rodney Koeneke (born September 12, 1968) is an American poet.

Life and career
Born in Omaha, Nebraska, Koeneke was raised in Tucson, Arizona and Hacienda Heights, California. He graduated with a BA in History from the University of California, Berkeley in 1990, where he lived in Barrington Hall, and from Stanford University with a PhD in History and Humanities in 1997.
 
Koeneke is the author of several books and chapbooks of poetry, including Body & Glass (2018), Etruria (2014),
Musee Mechanique (2006),
and Rouge State (2003).
His work has appeared in
The Brooklyn Rail,
Fence, 
Granta, Gulf Coast,
Harper's, Harriet,
The Nation,
New American Writing,
Poetry, 
and Zyzzyva.
 
He lives in Portland, Oregon.

Works

Full Length Poetry
Body & Glass (Wave Books, 2018) 
Etruria (Wave Books, 2014) 
Musee Mechanique (BlazeVOX, 2006) 
Rouge State (Pavement Saw, 2003)

Chapbooks
Seven for Boetticher & Other Poems (Hooke Press, 2015)
Names of the Hits (of Diane Warren) (OMG!, 2010)
Rules for Drinking Forties (Cy Press, 2009)
On the Clamways (Sea Lamb, 2004)

Non-fiction
Empires of the Mind: I.A. Richards and Basic English in China, 1929-1979 (Stanford University Press, 2004)

References

External links

1968 births
Stanford University alumni
University of California, Berkeley alumni
American male poets
20th-century American poets
Writers from San Francisco
Writers from Portland, Oregon
Living people
20th-century American male writers
21st-century American poets
21st-century American male writers